Sabroom is a town and a Nagar Panchayat in South Tripura district in the Indian state of Tripura. It is located on the banks of the Feni River, which separates India and Bangladesh. Most of the population speak Noakhailla. It is believed that during the Bangladesh War of Independence in 1971, the Hindu society people migrated to Sabroom from Noakhali and Feni districts of Bangladesh.

Geography

Demographics
 India census, Sabroom had a population of 5766. Males constitute 52% of the population and females 48%. Sabroom has an average literacy rate of 82%, higher than the national average of 59.5%: male literacy is 86%, and female literacy is 78%. In Sabroom, 11% of the population is under 6 years of age.

Politics
Sabroom assembly constituency is part of Tripura East (Lok Sabha constituency).

See also
 List of cities and towns in Tripura

References

Cities and towns in South Tripura district
South Tripura district